Luis Enrique Lemus Dávila (born April 21, 1992 in Aguascalientes City) is a Mexican former professional cyclist, who rode professionally between 2012 and 2018 for the ,  and  teams.

Major results

2011
 2nd Time trial, National Under-23 Road Championships
2012
 1st  Road race, National Road Championships
2013
 1st  Road race, National Road Championships
2014
 1st  Road race, National Road Championships
 5th Overall Tour de Hokkaido
1st Stage 2
2016
 1st  Road race, National Road Championships
 9th Overall Sibiu Cycling Tour
2018
 2nd Time trial, National Road Championships

References

External links

1992 births
Living people
Mexican male cyclists
Cyclists at the 2016 Summer Olympics
Olympic cyclists of Mexico
Sportspeople from Aguascalientes